The 2019–20 Eastern Counties Football League, also known as the Thurlow Nunn League for sponsorship reasons, was the 77th season in the history of Eastern Counties Football League, a football competition in England. Teams are divided into three divisions, the Premier Division, Division One North and Division One South (Eastern Senior League).

As a result of the COVID-19 pandemic, this season's competition was formally abandoned on 26 March 2020, with all results from the season being expunged, and no promotion or relegation taking place to, from, or within the competition. On 30 March 2020, sixty-six non-league clubs sent an open letter to the Football Association requesting that they reconsider their decision. A legal appeal against the decision, funded by the Northern Premier League's South Shields, was dismissed later in June.

Premier Division

The Premier Division featured 17 clubs which competed in the division last season, along with three new clubs:
Mildenhall Town, relegated from the Isthmian League
Stanway Rovers, transferred from the Essex Senior League
Swaffham Town, promoted from Division One North

League table

Stadia and locations

Division One North

Division One North featured 17 clubs which competed in the division last season, along with three new clubs:
 Framlingham Town, relegated from the Premier Division
 Great Yarmouth Town, relegated from the Premier Division
 Sheringham, promoted from the Anglian Combination

League table

Division One South (Eastern Senior League)

Division One South featured 17 clubs which competed in the division last season, along with three new clubs, relegated from the Essex Senior League:
 Barkingside
 Leyton Athletic

League table

References

Eastern Counties Football League
Eastern Counties Football League seasons
Eastern Counties Football League